Oniromyia is a genus of bee flies in the family Bombyliidae, the sole genus of the subfamily Oniromyiinae. There are at least two described species in Oniromyia.

Species
These two species belong to the genus Oniromyia:
 Oniromyia caffrariae Hesse, 1960w c g
 Oniromyia pachycerata (Bigot, 1892)w c g
Data sources: w=World Catalog of Bee Flies, c=Catalogue of Life, g=GBIF

References

Bombyliidae